The Agogna (in Piedmontese Agògna) is a  stream which runs through the Italian regions of Piedmont and Lombardy. It is a left side tributary of the river Po.

Course

The river's origin is in the area between Lake Orta and Lake Maggiore in the province of Verbano-Cusio-Ossola. It then flows south into the province of Novara and flows past Borgomanero and Cureggio before being joined by a branch of the Terdoppio. The river continues to flow south past Caltignaga and Novara. The river then crosses into the province of Pavia and into the Lomellina area (in the communes of Castello d'Agogna and Lomello) and receives its left tributary, the Erbognone. Finally, the river flows into the Po at Balossa Bigli, part of the comune of Mezzana Bigli, which is near the border between the province of Pavia and the province of Alessandria.

During the Napoleonic conquest of Italy, the Agogna gave its name to a department of the Kingdom of Italy with Novara as capital (See: Novara).

References

External links 

 Le Oasi della Federazione Nazionale Pro Natura , click on the L’Agogna Morta for a description of a nature reserve on the banks of the river in  Borgolavezzaro and Nicorvo.
 Centro di Formazione Ambientale Monferrato , in particular the section on the LIPU Oasi di Agognate nature reserve through which the Agogna runs.

Rivers of Italy
Rivers of the Province of Novara
Rivers of the Province of Pavia
Rivers of the Province of Verbano-Cusio-Ossola
Rivers of the Alps